Qatar competed at the 2020 Winter Youth Olympics in Lausanne, Switzerland from 9 to 22 January 2020.

Qatar's team consisted of one male hockey player competing in the mixed NOC 3x3 tournament. This marked the country's debut at a Winter Olympics.

Ice hockey

Mixed NOC 3x3 tournament 

Boys
Thawab Al-Subaey

See also
Qatar at the 2020 Summer Olympics

References

2020 in Qatari sport
Nations at the 2020 Winter Youth Olympics
Qatar at the Youth Olympics